Slingsby Aviation was a British aircraft manufacturer based in Kirkbymoorside, North Yorkshire, England. The company was founded to design and build gliders and sailplanes. From the early 1930s to around 1970 it built over 50% of all British club gliders and had success at national and international level competitions. It then produced some powered aircraft, notably the composite built Firefly trainer, before becoming a producer of specialised composite materials and components. 

The business is now known as Marshall Advanced Composites and produces composite parts for ships, submarines and aircraft. It is a subsidiary of Marshall of Cambridge.

History

The business was founded in Scarborough by Frederick Nicholas Slingsby, an RAF pilot in World War I. In 1920 he bought a partnership in a woodworking and furniture factory in Queen Street, Scarborough. In 1930 Slingsby was one of the founders of the Scarborough Gliding Club. After repairing some of the club's gliders, Slingsby's business built its first aircraft, a German designed RRG Falke which flew in 1931. By late 1933 Slingsby was advertising training gliders for sale. In 1934, encouraged by a local landowner, the business moved to Kirkbymoorside, some 30 miles from Scarborough, operating as Slingsby, Russell & Brown Ltd. As demand for gliders built up, a new factory was needed and built in Welburn, just outside Kirkbymoorside. This opened in July 1939, when Slingsby Sailplanes Ltd was founded. The best selling Slingsby glider in the pre-World War II period was the Primary.

During the war Slingsby built parts for other company's aircraft as well as their own military glider, the Slingsby Hengist, though the latter did not see action. Towards the end of the war and afterwards the company produced large numbers of training gliders for the Air Training Corps (ATC). After the war Slingsby continued to make increasingly refined gliders for civilian use in clubs and competitions. Their greatest success was with the Sky at the 1952 World Gliding Championships, which finished in first, third and fourth place. The later Slingsby Skylark series was their post war best seller. Slingsby began to move toward glass reinforced plastic (GRP) and metal construction methods, but the company, trading as Slingsby Aircraft Ltd since 1967, went into liquidation in July 1969 following a disastrous fire in the previous November.

After this Slingsby became part of the Vickers Group in November 1969, initially as Vickers-Slingsby Sailplanes Ltd, then reverting to the old name of Slingsby Sailplanes Ltd, and original design declined, though they built versions of other aircraft, both powered and unpowered. Slingsby’s last glider, which was also their last original design, was the GRP Slingsby T.65 Vega. This ceased production in 1982, by which time high performance sailplane design had moved away from the UK. During the upheavals in the British aerospace and marine sector the company became Slingsby Engineering, part of the public/private holding company British Underwater Engineering (UBE). In July 1982  Slingsby Aviation was set up by, and as part, of Slingsby Engineering. Slingsby Aviation passed from UBE to ML holdings in 1993, then to Cobham plc in December 1995. Slingsby's last aircraft was the T-67 Firefly, a two-seater military training aircraft, originally a René Fournier design but structurally reworked by Slingsby into a wholly composite machine. At this time Slingsby Aviation employed around 130 people on its 12,220 square metre (131,000 square feet) site. The company had its own airfield at Kirkbymoorside with a 750-metre reinforced grass runway. Slingsby Aviation’s SAH 2200 hovercraft has operated in such varied regions as the Arctic Circle and Africa. Two are seen in the James Bond film, Die Another Day.

On 10 August 2006 the name of the company was changed to Slingsby Advanced Composites. Since then the company was owned by three individuals and was no longer a part of Cobham plc.

On 8 January 2010 the UK company Marshall Aerospace bought Slingsby Advanced Composites Ltd which currently trades as Marshall Slingsby Advanced Composites.

In 2020, Marshall Slingsby Advanced Composites won the Aerospace Company of the Year in the Corporate Live Wire North England Prestige Awards.

Aircraft

 

Baynes Bat – experimental glider 1943
Buxton Hjordis
CAMCO IIA – not completed
Slingsby T.1 Falcon 1 – single seat sport glider 1931
Slingsby T.2 Falcon 2
Slingsby T.3 Primary (Dagling)
Slingsby T.4 Falcon 3
Slingsby T.5 Grunau Baby
Slingsby T.6 Kirby Kite
Slingsby T.7 Kirby Cadet (Cadet TX.1)
Slingsby T.8 Kirby Tutor (Cadet TX.2)
Slingsby T.9 King Kite
Slingsby T.12 Kirby Gull 1
Slingsby T.13 Petrel
Slingsby T.14 Gull 2
Slingsby T.15 Gull 3
Slingsby T.17 – military transport glider project to meet Air Ministry Specification 10/40, not built.
Slingsby T.18 Hengist – military glider 1942
Slingsby T.19 (target glider)
Slingsby T.20
Slingsby T.21 (Sedbergh TX.1)
Slingsby T.23 Kite 1A
Slingsby T.24 Falcon 4
Slingsby T.25 Gull 4
Slingsby T.26 Kite 2
Slingsby T.29A/B Motor Tutor
Slingsby T.30 Prefect
Slingsby T.31 Tandem Tutor (Cadet TX.3)
Slingsby T.34 Sky
Slingsby T.35 Austral
Slingsby T.37 Skylark 1
Slingsby T.38 Grasshopper TX.1
Slingsby T.41 Skylark 2
Slingsby T.42 Eagle
Slingsby T.43 Skylark 3
Slingsby T.45 Swallow
Slingsby T.46 (a.k.a. T.21C)
Slingsby T.49 Capstan
Slingsby T.50 Skylark 4
Slingsby T.51 Dart
Slingsby T.53
Slingbsy T.56 S.E.5A replica Currie Wot based 
Slingsby T.57 Sopwith Camel replica
Slingsby T.58 Rumpler C.IV replica
Slingsby HP-14C – redesign of Schreder HP-14
Slingsby T.59 Kestrel
Slingsby T.61 Falke (Venture T.1/T.2)
Slingsby T.65 Vega
Slingsby T.66 Nipper Mk 3
Slingsby T.67 Firefly

References

Slingsby Sailplanes, by Martin Simons, Airlife Publishing 1996 :  drawings, descriptions and many photographs of all Slingsby gliders.
Taylor, Michael J.H. . ''Jane's Encyclopedia of Aviation". Studio Editions. London. 1989.  
Coates, Andrew. "Jane's World Sailplanes & Motor Gliders". 2nd edition. London, Jane's. 1980. 
Simons, Martin. "Sailplanes 1920–1945". 2nd revised edition. EQIP Werbung und Verlag G.m.b.H.. Königswinter. 2006. 
Simons, Martin. "Sailplanes 1945–1965". 2nd revised edition. EQIP Werbung und Verlag G.m.b.H.. Königswinter. 2006. 
Simons, Martin. "Sailplanes 1965–2000". 2nd revised edition. EQIP Werbung und Verlag G.m.b.H.. Königswinter. 2005.

External links

Marshall Advanced Composites website
Sailplane directory Slingsby gliders
History of Slingsby

Aircraft manufacturers of England
Companies based in Ryedale
Glider manufacturers
1931 establishments in England
Vehicle manufacturing companies established in 1931
Vickers
Kirkbymoorside